St. Anne’s (/sa:nt æns/) Convent School is a co-educational secondary school in Chandigarh, India with English-language education affiliated to Central Board of Secondary Education (CBSE). It is a Christian minority institution, established by the Simla- Chandigarh Educational Society, in 1977. It is  administered by the Religious Congregation of the Ursuline Sisters of Mary Immaculate, in the Catholic Church.  The school is under the religious jurisdiction of the Catholic bishop of Simla- Chandigarh Diocese.

Location 
St. Anne's Convent School is located at 30° 42′ 22″ N and 76° 46′ 26″ E co-ordinates in Chandigarh. It lies on Chandi Path in Sector 32 C, one of the southern sectors of Chandigarh. It covers an area of around 30,000m2.

Achievements 
 A student topped the All India Institute of Medical Sciences MBBS Entrance Exam for the year 2013.
 A student got All India Rank 103 in the Indian Administrative Services (IAS) exam of the year 2013. 
 A student made it to the 'Top 200' list of the Indian Administrative Services (IAS) exam with the All India rank of 184 in 2013.
A student made it to top 100 in the Indian Administrative Services Exam (IAS) exam in the year 2014.
 A student of St. Anne’s Convent Chandigarh topped the National Talent Search Examination in UT Chandigarh (2011–12) conducted by NCERT.
 Prakash Gupta topped tricity in UG-AIPMT 2014.
 The school was awarded best day school in 'Admissions Transparency' with a rating of 77 out of 100 in the year 2010 along with Springdales School, New Delhi and Inventure Academy, Bangalore with 77 rating each.
 Dr Dalip Kumar passed out from the school in 1996 and got distinction certificate in class 10th Exam in the Social Sciences subject by securing 97 marks out of 100. He won gold medals at the state level cycling events. Gold Medal from DAV college Chandigarh, in 1997 for his contribution towards sports. He continued his further university education to become  doctor and is currently  Emergency Department consultant at the Southend University Hospital in Westcliff-on-Sea, United Kingdom. In August 2016 he was awarded a Young Emergency Medicine Doctors fellowship by the European Society of Emergency Medicine.Reference EUSEM website and Southend University Hospital Website.

Notable alumni
 Sachin Bansal, co-founder of Flipkart.
 Binny Bansal, co-founder of Flipkart.

SAOSA
St. Anne's Old Student Association abbreviated as SAOSA is an association of school's alumni. It organizes programs and sports matches between school current and old students.

References

External links 
 
  Video of the school, by a former student

High schools and secondary schools in Chandigarh
Christian schools in Chandigarh
Catholic schools in India
Educational institutions established in 1977
1977 establishments in Chandigarh